Habrocestoides is a genus of the spider family Salticidae (jumping spiders). Most species are endemic to India, with H. phulchokiensis found only in Nepal.

Name
The genus name is an alteration of the salticid genus name Habrocestum with the meaning "having the likeness of Habrocestum".

Species
As of May 2017, the World Spider Catalog lists the following species in the genus:
 Habrocestoides bengalensis Prószyński, 1992  – India
 Habrocestoides darjeelingus Logunov, 1999 – India
 Habrocestoides indicus Prószyński, 1992 – India
 Habrocestoides micans Logunov, 1999 – India
 Habrocestoides nitidus Logunov, 1999 – India
 Habrocestoides phulchokiensis Logunov, 1999 – Nepal

References

Salticidae
Spiders of Asia
Salticidae genera